Adilović is a Bosniak surname meaning "son of Adil". Notable people with the surname include:

Adi Adilović (born 1983), Bosnia and Herzegovina footballer
 (born 1986), Austrian footballer
Eldin Adilović (born 1986), Bosnia and Herzegovina footballer

Bosnian surnames
Patronymic surnames